David Morral Lewis (1864–1925) was a Welsh international footballer. He was part of the Wales national football team, playing 2 matches and scoring 1 goal. He played his first match on 8 February 1890 against Ireland  and his last match on 22  March 1890 against Scotland . At club level, he played for Bangor

See also
 List of Wales international footballers (alphabetical)

References

1864 births
1925 deaths
Welsh footballers
Wales international footballers
Bangor City F.C. players
Place of birth missing
Date of death missing

Association footballers not categorized by position